Marlon Devon Mack (born March 7, 1996) is an American football running back who is a free agent. He played college football at South Florida and was drafted by the Indianapolis Colts in the fourth round of the 2017 NFL draft.

Early years
Mack attended Booker High School in Sarasota, Florida. As a senior, he rushed for 1,527 yards and 19 touchdowns for the Tornadoes. He totaled 1,666 yards from scrimmage and scored 22 touchdowns on offense, and made 100 tackles and intercepted four passes on defense. He committed to the University of South Florida to play college football.

Recruiting
Mack was a four star recruit according to ESPN and 247Sports.com. The Scout.com and Rivals.com recruiting networks each gave him three stars. Mack received over a dozen scholarship offers from schools including Michigan, Louisville, Indiana, Iowa State, Florida Atlantic, Florida International, Marshall, and Ball State. Mack initially made a (soft) commit to UCLA but decommitted following a coaching change for the Bruins. Mack took an official visit to Louisville on January 17, 2014. Louisville believed Mack had committed to the Cardinals, but he chose USF on signing day.

College career
Mack attended and played college football for the University of South Florida from 2014 to 2016. In his first game at South Florida his freshman year in 2014, he tied the school record with 275 rushing yards. He finished the season with 1,041 rushing yards, a USF freshman record, on 202 carries with nine touchdowns over 12 starts. As a sophomore in 2015, he again started all 12 games and rushed for 1,381 yards on 210 carries and nine touchdowns. During his junior season, Mack became South Florida's all-time leading rushing, passing Andre Hall's 2,731. For the season, he rushed for 1,187 yards on 174 carries and had 15 touchdowns. After the season, he entered the 2017 NFL Draft. He finished his career with 3,609 yards on 586 carries and 32 touchdowns.

Collegiate statistics

Professional career

Indianapolis Colts
The Indianapolis Colts selected Mack in the fourth round (143rd overall) of the 2017 NFL Draft. Mack became the first running back to be drafted from the University of South Florida and was the 15th running back drafted in 2017. He was the 28th USF player to be selected in the history of the NFL draft.

2017 season
On May 17, 2017, the Indianapolis Colts signed Mack to a four-year, $2.81 million contract that includes a signing bonus of $419,648.

Throughout training camp, Mack competed to be the primary backup running back against Robert Turbin and Josh Ferguson. Head coach Chuck Pagano named Mack the third running back on the Colts’ depth chart to begin the regular season, behind Frank Gore and Robert Turbin.

Mack made his NFL debut in the season-opener at the Los Angeles Rams and had ten carries for 24 yards. He scored his first NFL touchdown on a three-yard carry during the fourth quarter of their 46–9 loss. In addition, he made his first career reception on a 21-yard pass from quarterback Scott Tolzien and fumbled once. Mack was inactive for two games (Weeks 3–4) due to a shoulder injury. In Week 5, Mack had nine carries for a season-high 91 rushing yards and a touchdown during a 26–23 overtime victory against the San Francisco 49ers. Three weeks later, Mack had a season-high 11 carries for 27 yards and caught three passes for 36 yards and made his first touchdown reception on a 24-yard pass from quarterback Jacoby Brissett during the third quarter as the Colts narrowly lost 24–23 at the Cincinnati Bengals in Week 8.

Mack finished his rookie year with 93 carries for 358 rushing yards and three rushing touchdowns to go along with 21 receptions for 225 receiving yards and one receiving touchdown in 14 games.

2018 season
Mack entered training camp slated as the starting running back after Frank Gore departed in free agency. Mack was named the starting running back to begin the regular season. Mack was inactive for the season-opening 34–23 loss against the Cincinnati Bengals after suffering a hamstring injury in the first preseason game. Mack was sidelined for three consecutive games (Weeks 3–5) after aggravating his hamstring injury.

In Week 7, Mack had 19 carries for 126 rushing yards and two touchdowns during a 37–5 victory against the Buffalo Bills. On October 28, 2018, Mack ran the ball 25 times for 132 yards and two touchdowns in the Colts 42–28 win at the Oakland Raiders in a Week 8. He became the first Colts running back since Joseph Addai in 2007 to post back-to-back 100-yard rushing games. During Week 15, Mack had a season-high 27 carries for 139 rushing yards and two touchdowns during a 23–0 win over the Dallas Cowboys. He was just the second player all season to rush for over 100 yards against the Cowboys, and the first since 2015 to run for 100 yards and two scores. He also became just the third player in Colts franchise history to have multiple games with at least 125 yards rushing and two touchdowns in the same season, joining Eric Dickerson (1987) and Edgerrin James (1999 and 2005).

Mack finished his second season with 908 rushing yards and nine rushing touchdowns. He added 17 receptions for 103 yards and a touchdown. The Colts made the playoffs as the No. 6 seed. In the Wild Card Round against the Houston Texans, Mack set a franchise postseason record with 148 yards and a touchdown on 24 carries in a 21–7 victory. In the Divisional Round against the Kansas City Chiefs, he had nine carries for 46 yards in the 31–13 loss.

2019 season
During the season-opener against the Los Angeles Chargers, Mack rushed 25 times for 174 yards which included a career-high 63-yard touchdown run in the 24–30 overtime loss. In Week 3 against the Atlanta Falcons, Mack rushed 16 times for 74 yards and a touchdown as the Colts won 27–24. In week 5 against the Kansas City Chiefs, Mack rushed 29 times for 132 yards and caught three passes for 16 yards in the 19–13 win. During Week 11 against the Jacksonville Jaguars, Mack finished with 109 rushing yards and a touchdown before fracturing his hand in the 33–13 win. In the 2019 season, Mack finished with 1,091 rushing yards and eight rushing touchdowns.

2020 season
During Week 1 against the Jacksonville Jaguars, Mack left the game with an injury. An MRI revealed that Mack had suffered a torn Achilles and was ruled out for the rest of the season. He was placed on injured reserve on September 16.

2021 season
Mack re-signed with the Colts on March 23, 2021. In six games, he finished with 28 carries for 101 rushing yards.

Houston Texans
On April 11, 2022, Mack signed with the Houston Texans. He was released on August 30, 2022, and signed to the practice squad the next day. He was released on September 5.

San Francisco 49ers
On September 14, 2022, the San Francisco 49ers signed Mack to their practice squad. He was promoted to the active roster on September 21. He was released on October 11. He signed back to the practice squad the following day.

Denver Broncos
On October 24, 2022, the Denver Broncos signed Mack off the San Francisco 49ers' practice squad. He went on to play six games, recording 84 rushing yards and a touchdown, along with eight catches for 99 yards and a touchdown.

NFL career statistics

Regular season

Postseason

References

External links

San Francisco 49ers bio
South Florida Bulls bio

1996 births
Living people
Sportspeople from Sarasota, Florida
Players of American football from Florida
American football running backs
South Florida Bulls football players
Indianapolis Colts players
Houston Texans players
San Francisco 49ers players
Denver Broncos players